Electric Gumbo: A Lansdale Reader is one of the rarer compilations of Joe R. Lansdale's short works.  It has only been published once, exclusively by the Quality Paperback Book Club in trade paperback form in 1994.

It contains:

Introduction
The Drive-In (A Novel) [full reprinting] (nominated for Bram Stoker Award)
By Bizarre Hands  {originally published in Hardboiled #9 (1988)}
Drive-In Date  {originally published in Night Visions 8 (1991)}
The Events Concerning a Nude Fold-Out Found in a Harlequin Romance (winner of Bram Stoker Award) {originally published in Dark at Heart, ed. Joe & Karen Lansdale (1992)}
The Fat Man and the Elephant  {originally published in By Bizarre Hands (1989)}
A Hard-On for Horror: Low Budget Excitement (non-fiction)  {extended from shorter version, probably published in 1985 in Twilight Zone Magazine, or at some point in 1992}
 Hell Through A Windshield (non-fiction)  {extended from shorter version published in Twilight Zone Magazine, Mar/Apr 1985}
The Job  {originally published in Razored Saddles, ed. Joe R. Lansdale & Pat LoBrutto (1989)}
Mister Weed-Eater  {originally published by (James) Cahill Press (1993)}
Night They Missed the Horror Show  (winner of Bram Stoker Award) {originally published in Silver Scream, ed. David J. Schow (1988)}
 On the Far Side of the Cadillac Desert With Dead Folks  (winner of Bram Stoker Award) {originally published in Book of the Dead, ed. John M. Skipp & Craig Spector (1989)}
The Phone Woman  {originally published in Night Visions 8 (1991)}
The Pit  {originally published in The Black Lizard Anthology of Crime Fiction, ed. Ed Gorman (1987)}
The Steel Valentine  {originally published in By Bizarre Hands (1989)}
Steppin' Out, Summer, '68  {originally published in Night Visions 8 (1991)}
Tight Little Stitches In A Dead Man's Back  {originally published in Nukes, ed. John Maclay (1986)}
Trains Not Taken {originally published in RE:AL, Spring 1987}
Wild Bill's Body (excerpt from the novel The Magic Wagon)

This compilation contains nothing exclusive.

References

External links 
Author's Official Website

Short story collections by Joe R. Lansdale
1994 short story collections
Horror short story collections
Works by Joe R. Lansdale